Haller park  is the biggest park in mid-Ferencváros, the 9th district of Budapest, Hungary. It is bordered by Haller utca on the west, Mester utca on the south, Vágóhíd utca on the east and Óbester utca on the north.

Facilities
The park has various recreational facilities including ballgame fields, well-designated fully EU-conforming playgrounds, a sledge hill and walkways for strolls. The park is particularly popular with families with children and old people relaxing in quiet.

Some residential buildings are dotted along its border, whereas a small one-storey nursery school and a creche occupy some space in the north of the park.

As a response to public concern, a park guard system went operational in May 2008, proving successful immediately.

Flora and fauna
Haller park has numerous tree species: chestnuts, poplars, black poplars, willows, lindens, yews and planes. Birds abound, too: blackbirds, tits, Eurasian blue tits, robins, magpies, pigeons, sparrows and even crows. As regards mammals, hedgehogs and squirrels can be seen quite infrequently. Dogs, by contrast, are all too obvious a sight.

Parks in Budapest